The Maze of the Beast is the sixth book in the Deltora Quest novel series, written by Emily Rodda. It was published in 2001 by Scholastic.

Plot summary
Lief, Barda, and Jasmine had retrieved the emerald from Dread Mountain. They travel along the River Tor to get to the Maze of the Beast, where they will get the amethyst. The gems they are taking are part of a Belt of Deltora, which will defeat the Shadow Lord that has invaded Deltora. During their travel, they encounter a pair of children nearly drowning in a stream. They save the children, but they reveal themselves to be Ols, creatures created by the Shadow Lord that can transform themselves to become another living creature. These creatures overrun the west side of Deltora to keep the gems hidden. Just before Barda is about to die, a boy Dain attacks the Ols and saves them. In the process, Dain injures his arm and several ribs. This causes Lief to sympathize for the boy, and take him to the Resistance, a group of people who rebel against the Shadow Lord. Arriving at the entrance to the Resistance's hideout, Dain faints from the pressure and forces the three to guess the password before they are marked as Ols and killed. Lief finds a note and realizes that the password is the first letter of every word on the note. They enter the Resistance and Doom, a man they have encountered before, tests them by putting them in a prison for three days. The test is supposed to find out if they are Ols because Ols can only hold their shape for three days. As three days pass, Doom does not let up and keeps them imprisoned. Dain frees them from the cave in exchange for their agreeing to take him to Tora. When Lief, Barda, and Jasmine reveal that they are not going to Tora, they split apart to make them less recognizable. Lief, Dain, and Barda take a boat that takes them down the river to the Maze of the Beast. They realize that Jasmine was also on the boat. The boat is raided by pirates, and Dain is taken prisoner. After reaching the Maze, Barda is revealed to be an Ol by the real Barda. Unfortunately, they are captured by pirates and are dumped into the Maze. After finding the location of the gem, Barda and Jasmine separate from Lief to lead the Beast away and Lief stays to carve the gem out of a column. They regroup when Lief was done, and escape the cave through a blowhole. The blowhole blows just after they escape, which takes the life of two pirates. The three then start off their journey to the Valley of the Lost.

Characters

Lief: Lief is the main character of the series. As a child Lief roamed the streets of Del, sharpening his wits and gaining him the skills needed for his future quests. On his sixteenth birthday it is revealed to him that he must begin a dangerous quest to find the lost gems of the Belt of Deltora.
Barda: Barda was enlisted to help find the lost gems of Deltora before the initial story takes place. For the next sixteen years, Barda disguised himself as a beggar so as to discover information vital to the quest..
Jasmine: Jasmine is a wild girl, described as having wild black hair and emerald green eyes, who has grown up in the Forests of Silence, where Lief and Barda meet her shortly after leaving Del. She can understand the language of the trees and of many animals, and has incredibly sharp senses, but has trouble understanding some social customs. Jasmine is usually seen with her raveb, Kree, and a mouse-like creature she calls Filli. Jasmine is like Lief and occasionally has a quick temper. After helping Lief and Barda in the forest and with the help of the topaz, she is greeted by her mother's spirit from beyond the grave, who tells her to go with Lief and Barda in their quest. After this encounter, she joins Lief and Barda in the search for the great gems that will complete the Belt.
Kree: Kree is a raven and one of Jasmine's closest companions in the Forest of Silence. His family was taken and eaten by the witch Thaegan, and Kree was found by Jasmine. She took pity on him, as both had their family taken away, and she took care of Kree. Kree treats Jasmine as his master, and does not tolerate offensive behavior towards Jasmine. His presence is advantageous towards the three companions, as he is able to fly ahead and warn the others of oncoming danger or safety.
Filli: Filli is a small, mouse-like creature (although Jasmine denies that he resembles any rodent). He was rescued by Jasmine when she discovered him paralyzed by the Wenn in The Forests of Silence. As such, he remains close to Jasmine and Kree, often hiding himself in Jasmine's clothing when danger arises. Like Kree, Jasmine is able to understand Filli. His small size is often advantageous to Lief, Barda and Jasmine, as he is able to hide easily and eavesdrop on others.
The Glus: The Glus is the Guardian of the amethyst. It resembles a giant blue slug. It lives in the cavern called the Maze of the Beast. It cannot see, so relies on its hearing to survive.
Dain: Dain is a timid young boy. He saves Lief, Barda, and Jasmine from the Ols. Through the series he shows feelings for Jasmine, making Lief jealous.

See also

Deltora series
Deltora Quest (anime)

References

External links
Official US Deltora website
 of Emily Rodda
The Maze of the Beast (2001 edition) at Google Books
The Maze of the Beast (2012 edition) at Google Books
The Maze of the Beast at Goodreads

2001 Australian novels
2001 fantasy novels
Australian children's novels
Australian fantasy novels
Children's books set in subterranea
Deltora
2001 children's books